On 21 February 2013 a series of car bombs were detonated in Damascus killing 83 people. The largest and deadliest of the bombs occurred near the headquarters of the Syria's ruling Ba'ath Party and the Russian Embassy, killing at least 60. Most of the victims were civilians including children.

References

Car and truck bombings in Syria
Damascus in the Syrian civil war
Military operations of the Syrian civil war in 2013
Terrorist incidents in Syria in 2013
Attacks on diplomatic missions in Syria
Attacks on diplomatic missions of Russia
February 2013 events in Syria
Building bombings in Syria
Russia–Syria military relations